Bradley Buxer is an American keyboardist and composer, known for his many collaborations with the American musician Michael Jackson. In addition to recording with Jackson, Buxer was also the musical director for Jackson's tours for many years. Prior to that, he was a session musician for artists such as Stevie Wonder and Smokey Robinson and a member of the new wave band the Jetzons. In the 2000s, he reunited with former Jetzons bandmate Bruce Connole in The Suicide Kings.

Buxer was contracted by Jackson to write music for the 1994 video game Sonic the Hedgehog 3. He assembled a team composed of Bobby Brooks, Darryl Ross, Geoff Grace, Doug Grigsby III, and Cirocco Jones to assist him and Jackson. The theme of the game's IceCap Zone stage is an instrumental version of the then-unreleased 1981 song "Hard Times" by the Jetzons, of which Buxer was a member. Carnival Night Zone's background music incorporates elements of Jackson's 1991 song "Jam", while the game's ending theme was used as a base for Jackson's 1995 single "Stranger in Moscow".

He now works as a professional airline pilot.

Discography

Filmography

References

External links
Allmusic.com profile
Discogs.com profile

20th-century American keyboardists
Living people
Year of birth missing (living people)
Place of birth missing (living people)
20th-century American composers